Lee Jae-hun  (born 10 January 1990) is a South Korean footballer who plays as a defender for Seoul E-Land.

External links 

1990 births
Living people
Association football defenders
South Korean footballers
South Korea under-17 international footballers
South Korea under-20 international footballers
Gangwon FC players
Seoul E-Land FC players
Gyeongju Citizen FC players
K League 1 players
K League 2 players
K3 League players
Yonsei University alumni